The 2013 Pittsburgh Pirates season was the franchise's 127th season as a member of the National League, 132nd season overall, and 13th season at PNC Park. The regular season began at home with a loss against the Chicago Cubs on April 1 and ended with a win at Great American Ball Park against the Cincinnati Reds on September 29. In their first winning season since 1992, the Pirates finished in second place in the National League Central Division with 94 wins and 68 losses.

The Pirates earned their 82nd win of the season on September 9, ensuring the team's first winning season since 1992 and ending the longest stretch of losing seasons—20—in North American professional sports history. Although the St. Louis Cardinals won the NL Central Division, the Pirates clinched a playoff berth for the first time since 1992 in one of two NL Wild Card spots on September 23. In the Wild Card Game, the Pirates secured their first postseason win since Game 6 of the 1992 National League Championship Series by defeating the Cincinnati Reds. In doing so, the team advanced to the 2013 National League Division Series, where they were defeated in five games by the eventual National League champion Cardinals, eliminating them from the 2013 postseason.

Five members of the 2013 Pirates were selected to represent the National League in the All-Star Game. In addition, team manager Clint Hurdle won the 2013 NL Manager of the Year Award in his third year with the Pirates, center fielder Andrew McCutchen was named NL Most Valuable Player, pitcher Francisco Liriano was named NL Comeback Player of the Year, and third baseman Pedro Álvarez tied for first place in home runs hit in the National League at 36.

Season standings

National League Central

National League playoff standings

Record vs. opponents

Detailed records

Regular season

April
April 4 – The Pirates take one out of three games against the Chicago Cubs in the season-opening series.
April 17 – Pitcher A. J. Burnett records his 2,000th career strikeout in a 5–0 victory over the St. Louis Cardinals.
April 29 – Russell Martin is named NL Player of the Week for the week ending April 28.
Jason Grilli wins the Delivery Man of the Month Award for April.
The Pirates finish the month with a win–loss record of 15–12, third in the NL Central and 0.5 games out of first.

May

May 11 – Pitcher Francisco Liriano makes his Pirates debut, striking out nine and allowing one run over 5.2 innings in an 11–2 road victory against the New York Mets. This was Liriano's first appearance of his NL Comeback Player of the Year season.
Jason Grilli wins the Delivery Man Award for May, his second of the season.
The Pirates finish the month with a win–loss record of 34–21, tied for second in the NL Central with the Cincinnati Reds and 2.0 games out of first.

June
June 11 – Starting pitcher Gerrit Cole makes his awaited MLB debut, in which he strikes out the first batter he faces on three pitches, records a two-run single, and pitches 6.1 innings to earn the win in an 8–2 home victory over the San Francisco Giants.
June 24 – Pedro Alvarez is named NL Player of the Week for the week ending June 23.
June 29 – The Pirates, with the best record in MLB, become the first team to reach 50 wins in the 2013 season.
The Pirates finish the month on a nine-game winning streak with a win–loss record of 51–30, first place in the NL Central with the best record in the majors.

July
July 7 – Pedro Alvarez (3B), Jason Grilli (P), Jeff Locke (P), Andrew McCutchen (OF), and Mark Melancon (P) are named to the National League All-Star team. The Pirates had not sent five players to the All-Star game since 1972.
July 14 – The Pirates enter the All-Star break with a win–loss record of 56–37, second in the NL Central and one game behind the St. Louis Cardinals.
The Pirates finish the month with a win–loss record of 65–42, first place in the NL Central with the best record in the majors.

August
August 1 – The Pirates win four games out of a five-game homestand, including a double-header sweep, against the St. Louis Cardinals to hold onto first place in the NL Central.
August 5 – Francisco Liriano is named NL Player of the Week for the week ending August 4.
August 28 – Recently acquired outfielder Marlon Byrd hits a three-run home run in his first game as a Pirate, contributing to a 7–1 home victory over the Milwaukee Brewers.
The Pirates finish the penultimate month of the regular season with a win–loss record of 79–56, one game ahead of the Cardinals for first place in the NL Central.

September
September 9 – After a four-game losing streak, the Pirates defeat the Texas Rangers on the road to secure their 82nd win of the season and ensure their first winning season since 1992.
September 20 – Pitcher Francisco Liriano records the 1,000th strikeout of his career in a 6–5 extra-inning home loss to the Cincinnati Reds.
September 23 – The Pirates defeat the Chicago Cubs on the road to secure their first playoff berth since 1992 as an NL Wild Card.
September 28 – The Pirates combine to hit six home runs against the Cincinnati Reds, five off of starter Bronson Arroyo, two of which were hit by Neil Walker in an 8–3 victory.
September 29 – The Pirates finish the regular season with a three-game away sweep of the Reds to earn home-field advantage in the NL Wild Card game.
Gerrit Cole is named NL Rookie of the Month for September, having earned a win in each of his four starts in September, improving his rookie season win–loss record to 10–7.
At the conclusion of the season, the Pirates had a win–loss record of 94–68, finishing second in the NL Central behind the St. Louis Cardinals.

Game log

|-  style="background:#fbb;"
| 1 || April 1 || Cubs || 1–3 || Samardzija (1–0) || Burnett (0–1) || Fujikawa (1) || 39,078 || 0–1
|-  style="background:#cfc;"
| 2 || April 3 || Cubs || 3–0 || Rodríguez (1–0) || Jackson (0–1) || Grilli (1) || 27,667 || 1–1
|-  style="background:#fbb;"
| 3 || April 4 || Cubs || 2–3 || Wood (1–0) || McDonald (0–1) || Mármol (1) || 11,634 || 1–2
|-  style="background:#fbb;"
| 4 || April 5 || @ Dodgers || 0–3 || Greinke (1–0) || Sánchez (0–1) || League (1) || 40,607 || 1–3
|-  style="background:#fbb;"
| 5 || April 6 || @ Dodgers || 0–1 || Kershaw (2–0) || Burnett (0–2) || League (2) || 39,446 || 1–4
|-  style="background:#fbb;"
| 6 || April 7 || @ Dodgers || 2–6 || Ryu (1–1) || Locke (0–1) || — || 52,503 || 1–5
|-  style="background:#cfc;"
| 7 || April 8 || @ Diamondbacks || 5–3 || Gómez (1–0) || Cahill (0–2) || Grilli (2) || 21,392 || 2–5
|-  style="background:#cfc;"
| 8 || April 9 || @ Diamondbacks || 6–5 || McDonald (1–1) || McCarthy (0–1) || Grilli (3) ||  19,872 || 3–5
|-  style="background:#fbb;"
| 9 || April 10 || @ Diamondbacks || 2–10 || Miley (2–0) || Sánchez (0–2) || — || 17,769 || 3–6
|-  style="background:#cfc;"
| 10 || April 12 || Reds || 6–5 || Watson (1–0) || Hoover (0–3) || Grilli (4) || 24,366 || 4–6
|-  style="background:#cfc;"
| 11 || April 13 || Reds || 3–1 || Locke (1–1) || Simón (0–1) || Grilli (5) || 25,118 || 5–6
|-  style="background:#cfc;"
| 12 || April 14 || Reds || 10–7 || Hughes (1–0) || Broxton (0–1) || — || 19,239 || 6–6
|-  style="background:#fbb;"
| 13 || April 15 || Cardinals || 6–10 || Lynn (2–0) || McDonald (1–2) || —  || 10,539 || 6–7
|-  style="background:#bbbbbb;"
| —  || April 16 || Cardinals || colspan=6| Postponed (rain) Makeup: July 30 
|-  style="background:#cfc;"
| 14 || April 17 || Cardinals || 5–0 || Burnett (1–2)  || Miller (2–1) || — || 9,570 || 7–7
|-  style="background:#fbb;"
| 15 || April 18 || Braves || 4–6 || Varvaro (1–0) || Hughes (0–1) || Kimbrel (7) || 11,288 || 7–8
|-  style="background:#cfc;"
| 16 || April 19 || Braves || 6–0 || Rodríguez (2–0) || Hudson (2–1) || — || 18,705 || 8–8
|-  style="background:#cfc;"
| 17 || April 20 || Braves || 3–1 ||  McDonald (2–2) ||  Maholm (3–1) ||  Grilli (6) ||  29,313 || 9–8
|-  style="background:#cfc;"
| 18 || April 21 || Braves || 4–2 ||  Wilson (1–0) || Medlen (1–2) || Grilli (7) || 20,873 || 10–8
|-  style="background:#fbb;"
| 19 || April 22 || @ Phillies || 2–3 || Valdés (1–0) || Hughes (1–2) || Papelbon (4) || 35,385 || 10–9
|-  style="background:#cfc;"
| 20 || April 23 || @ Phillies || 2–0 || Locke (2–1) || Hamels (0–3) || Grilli (8) || 31,002 || 11–9
|-  style="background:#cfc;"
| 21 || April 24 || @ Phillies || 5–3 || Mazzaro (1–0) || Adams (1–2) || Grilli (9) || 32,158 || 12–9
|-  style="background:#cfc;"
| 22 || April 25 || @ Phillies || 6–4 || Wilson (2–0) || Aumont (1–3) ||  Watson (1) || 33,443 || 13–9
|-  style="background:#fbb;"
| 23 || April 26 || @ Cardinals || 1–9 || Lynn (4–0) || Sánchez (0–3) || — || 44,090 || 13–10
|-  style="background:#cfc;"
| 24 || April 27 || @ Cardinals || 5–3 || Burnett (2–2) || Kelly (0–1) || Grilli (10) || 40,909 || 14–10
|-  style="background:#cfc;"
| 25 || April 28 || @ Cardinals || 9–0 || Locke (3–1) || Miller (3–2) || — || 41,470 || 15–10
|-  style="background:#fbb;"
| 26 || April 29 || @ Brewers || 4–10 || Gallardo (3–1) || Rodríguez (2–1) || — || 21,255 || 15–11
|-  style="background:#fbb;"
| 27 || April 30 || @ Brewers || 8–12 || Gorzelanny (1–0) || Morris (0–1) || — || 24,154 || 15–12
|-

|-  style="background:#cfc;"
| 28 || May 1 || @ Brewers || 6–4 || Morris (1–1) || Axford (0–3) || Grilli (11) || 26,079 || 16–12
|-  style="background:#cfc;"
| 29 || May 3 || Nationals || 3–1 || Burnett (3–2) || Detwiler (1–3) || Grilli (12) || 26,404 || 17–12
|-  style="background:#fbb;"
| 30 || May 4 || Nationals || 4–5 || Clippard (2–1) || Watson (1–1) || Soriano (10) || 29,975 || 17–13
|-  style="background:#fbb;"
| 31 || May 5 || Nationals || 2–6 || Gonzalez (3–2) || Rodríguez (2–2) || — || 24,186 || 17–14
|-  style="background:#cfc;"
| 32 || May 7 || Mariners || 4–1 || Gómez (2–0)  || Harang (1–4) || Grilli (13) || 12,973 || 18–14
|-  style="background:#fbb;"
| 33 || May 8 || Mariners || 1–2 || Hernández (5–2) || Burnett (3–3) || Wilhelmsen (9) || 18,877 || 18–15
|-  style="background:#fbb;"
| 34 || May 9 || @ Mets || 2–3 || Parnell (4–0) || Grilli (0–1) || —  || 20,147 || 18–16
|-  style="background:#cfc;"
| 35 || May 10 || @ Mets || 7–3 || Rodríguez (3–2) || Marcum (0–3) || Grilli (14) || 25,123 || 19–16
|-  style="background:#cfc;"
| 36 || May 11 || @ Mets || 11–2 || Liriano (1–0) || Niese (2–4) || — || 31,160 || 20–16
|-  style="background:#cfc;"
| 37 || May 12 || @ Mets || 3–2 || Wilson (3–0) || Rice (1–2) || Grilli (15) || 28,404 || 21–16
|-  style="background:#fbb;"
| 38 || May 13 || Brewers || 1–5 || Estrada (3–2) || Burnett (3–4) || — || 11,872 || 21–17
|-  style="background:#cfc;"
| 39 || May 14 || Brewers || 4–3 (12) || Mazzaro (2–0) || Fiers (0–2) || — || 11,556 || 22–17
|-  style="background:#cfc;"
| 40 || May 15 || Brewers || 3–1 || Rodríguez (4–2) || Gallardo (3–3) || Grilli (16) || 13,554 || 23–17
|-  style="background:#cfc;"
| 41 || May 16 || Brewers || 7–1 || Liriano (2–0) || Burgos (1–2) || — || 16,434 || 24–17
|-  style="background:#cfc;"
| 42 || May 17 || Astros || 5–4 || Wilson (4–0) || González (0–1) || — || 29,743 || 25–17
|-  style="background:#fbb;"
| 43 || May 18 || Astros || 2–4 (11) || Cisnero (1–0) || Morris (1–2) || Veras (6) || 32,925 || 25–18
|-  style="background:#cfc;"
| 44 || May 19 || Astros || 1–0 || Locke (4–1) || Harrell (3–5) || Grilli (17)  || 28,471 || 26–18
|-  style="background:#cfc;"
| 45 || May 21 || Cubs || 5–4 || Rodríguez (5–2) || Russell (0–1) || Grilli (18) || 16,092 || 27–18
|-  style="background:#cfc;"
| 46 || May 22 || Cubs || 1–0 ||  Liriano (3–0) || Samardzija (2–6) || Melancon (1) || 12,675  || 28–18
|-  style="background:#cfc;"
| 47 || May 23 || Cubs || 4–2 || Mazzaro (3–0) || Jackson (1–7) || Grilli (19) || 24,552 || 29–18
|-  style="background:#fbb;"
| 48 || May 24 || @ Brewers || 1–2 || Estrada (4–2) || Burnett (3–5) || Rodríguez (1) || 33,874 || 29–19
|-  style="background:#cfc;"
| 49 || May 25 || @ Brewers || 5–2 || Locke (5–1) || Fiers (1–3) || — || 40,410 || 30–19
|-  style="background:#cfc;"
| 50 || May 26 || @ Brewers || 5–4 || Rodríguez (6–2) || Gallardo (3–5) || Grilli (20) || 44,626 || 31–19
|-  style="background:#fbb;"
| 51 || May 27 || @ Tigers || 5–6 || Verlander (6–4) || Liriano (3–1) || Valverde (6) || 41,416 || 31–20
|-  style="background:#cfc;"
| 52 || May 28 || @ Tigers || 1–0 (11) || Melancon (1–0) || Ortega (0–2) || Grilli (21) || 33,473 || 32–20
|-  style="background:#cfc;"
| 53 || May 29 || Tigers || 5–3 || Morris (2–2) || Sánchez (5–5) || Grilli (22) || 19,980 || 33–20
|-  style="background:#cfc;"
| 54 || May 30 || Tigers || 1–0 (11) || Morris (3–2) || Putkonen (1–1) || — || 20,834 || 34–20
|-  style="background:#fbb;"
| 55 || May 31 || Reds || 0–6 || Cueto (3–0) || Rodríguez (6–3) || — || 35,730 || 34–21
|-

|-  style="background:#fbb;"
| 56 || June 1 || Reds || 0–2 || Leake (5–2) || Liriano (3–2) || Chapman (14) || 33,912 || 34–22
|-  style="background:#cfc;"
| 57 || June 2 || Reds || 5–4 (11) || Wilson (5–0) || Simón (4–2) || — || 29,407 || 35–22
|-  style="background:#fbb;"
| 58 || June 3 || @ Braves || 2–7 || Medlen (2–6) || Burnett (3–6) || — || 19,526 || 35–23
|-  style="background:#fbb;"
| 59 || June 4 || @ Braves || 4–5 (10) || Varvaro (3–0) || Melancon (1–1) || — || 28,861 || 35–24
|-  style="background:#fbb;"
| 60 || June 5 || @ Braves || 0–5 || Teherán (4–2) || Rodríguez (6–4) || — || 28,703 || 35–25
|-  style="background:#cfc;"
| 61 || June 7 || @ Cubs || 2–0 || Liriano (4–2) || Wood (5–4) || Grilli (23) || 31,614 || 36–25
|-  style="background:#cfc;"
| 62 || June 8 || @ Cubs || 6–2 || Burnett (4–6) || Samardzija (3–7) || — || 38,405 || 37–25
|-  style="background:#fbb;"
| 63 || June 9 || @ Cubs || 1–4 || Jackson (2–8) || Wilson (5–1) || Gregg (7) || 31,858 || 37–26
|-  style="background:#cfc;"
| 64 || June 11 || Giants || 8–2 || Cole (1–0) || Lincecum (4–6) || — || 30,614 || 38–26
|-  style="background:#cfc;"
| 65 || June 12 || Giants || 12–8 || Liriano (5–2) || Zito (4–5) || — || 19,966 || 39–26
|-  style="background:#fbb;"
| 66 || June 13 || Giants || 0–10 || Cain (5–3) || Morton (0–1) || — || 22,532 || 39–27
|-  style="background:#cfc;"
| 67 || June 14 || Dodgers || 3–0 || Locke (6–1) || Fife (1–2) || Grilli (24) || 36,878 || 40–27
|-  style="background:#fbb;"
| 68 || June 15 || Dodgers || 3–5 (11) || Moylan (1–0) || Mazzaro (3–1) || League (14) || 36,941 || 40–28
|-  style="background:#cfc;"
| 69 || June 16 || Dodgers || 6–3 || Cole (2–0) || Greinke (3–2) || Grilli (25) || 37,263 || 41–28
|-  style="background:#fbb;"
| 70 || June 17 || @ Reds || 1–4 || Leake (7–3) || Liriano (5–3) || Chapman (18) || 28,892 || 41–29
|-  style="background:#cfc;"
| 71 || June 18 || @ Reds || 4–0 || Morton (1–1) || Latos (6–1) || — || 28,993 || 42–29
|-  style="background:#fbb;"
| 72 || June 19 || @ Reds || 1–2 (13) || Parra (1–1) || Mazzaro (3–2) || — || 36,567 || 42–30
|-  style="background:#cfc;"
| 73 || June 20 || @ Reds || 5–3 || Morris (4–2) || Simón (5–3) || Watson (2) || 40,929 || 43–30
|-  style="background:#cfc;"
| 74 || June 21 || @ Angels || 5–2 || Cole (3–0) || Weaver (1–4) || Grilli (26) || 40,136 || 44–30
|-  style="background:#cfc;"
| 75 || June 22 || @ Angels || 6–1 || Liriano (6–3) || Williams (5–3)  || — || 41,114 || 45–30
|-  style="background:#cfc;"
| 76 || June 23 || @ Angels || 10–9 (10) || Melancon (2–1) || Jepsen (0–2) || — || 35,069 || 46–30
|-  style="background:#cfc;"
| 77 || June 25 || @ Mariners || 9–4 || Locke (7–1) || Saunders (5–8) || — || 21,074 || 47–30
|-  style="background:#cfc;"
| 78 || June 26 || @ Mariners || 4–2 || Mazzaro (4–2) || Furbush (1–4) || Melancon (2) || 21,265 || 48–30
|-  style="background:#cfc;"
| 79 || June 28 || Brewers || 10–3 || Cole (4–0) || Hellweg (0–1) || Reid (1) || 36,875 || 49–30
|-  style="background:#cfc;"
| 80 || June 29 || Brewers || 2–1 || Liriano (7–3) || Hand (0–1) || Grilli (27) || 38,438 || 50–30
|-  style="background:#cfc;"
| 81 || June 30 || Brewers || 2–1 (14) || Watson (2–1) || Rodríguez (1–1) || — || 35,351 || 51–30
|-

|-  style="background:#fbb;"
| 82 || July 2 || Phillies || 1–3 || Pettibone (4–3) || Cumpton (0–1) || Papelbon (16) || 30,301 || 51–31
|-  style="background:#cfc;"
| 83 || July 3 || Phillies || 6–5 || Locke (8–1) || Lannan (1–3) || Grilli (28) || 33,197 || 52–31
|-  style="background:#fbb;"
| 84 || July 4 || Phillies || 4–6 || Hamels (3–11) || Cole (4–1) || Papelbon (17) || 35,328 || 52–32
|-  style="background:#cfc;"
| 85 || July 5 || @ Cubs || 6–2 || Liriano (8–3) || Samardzija (5–8) || — || 38,615 || 53–32
|-  style="background:#fbb;"
| 86 || July 6 || @ Cubs || 1–4 || Jackson (5–10) || Morton (1–2) || Gregg (15) || 36,590 || 53–33
|-  style="background:#fbb;"
| 87 || July 7 || @ Cubs || 3–4 (11) || Guerrier (3–4) || Morris (4–3) || — || 33,146 || 53–34
|-  style="background:#fbb;"
| 88 || July 8 || Athletics || 1–2 || Colón (12–3) || Locke (8–2) || Balfour (23) || 23,743 || 53–35
|-  style="background:#fbb;"
| 89 || July 9 || Athletics || 1–2 || Straily (6–2) || Cole (4–2) || Balfour (24) || 24,560 || 53–36
|-  style="background:#cfc;"
| 90 || July 10 || Athletics || 5–0 || Liriano (9–3) || Milone (8–8) || — || 23,474 || 54–36
|-  style="background:#cfc;"
| 91 || July 12 || Mets || 3–2 (11) || Mazzaro (5–2) || Germen (0–1) || — || 39,036 || 55–36
|-  style="background:#cfc;"
| 92 || July 13 || Mets || 4–2 || Wilson (6–1) || Burke (0–2) || Grilli (29) || 39,173 || 56–36
|-  style="background:#fbb;"
| 93 || July 14 || Mets || 2–4 || Gee (7–7) || Cole (4–3) || Parnell (17) || 37,490 || 56–37
|-  style="background:#bbb;"
|colspan=9| All–Star Break (July 15–18)
|-  style="background:#fbb;"
| 94 || July 19 || @ Reds || 3–5 || Leake (9–4) || Liriano (9–4) || Chapman (22) || 40,831 || 56–38
|-  style="background:#fbb;"
| 95 || July 20 || @ Reds || 4–5 || Latos (9–3) || Burnett (4–7) || Chapman (23) || 34,728 || 56–39
|-  style="background:#cfc;"
| 96 || July 21 || @ Reds || 3–2 || Locke (9–2) || Bailey (5–9) || Grilli (30) || 40,824 || 57–39
|-  style="background:#cfc;"
| 97 || July 22 || @ Nationals || 6–5 || Morton (2–2) || Haren (4–11) || Mazzaro (1) || 29,200 || 58–39
|-  style="background:#cfc;"
| 98 || July 23 || @ Nationals || 5–1 || Cole (5–3) || Jordan (0–3) || — || 32,976 || 59–39
|-  style="background:#cfc;"
| 99 || July 24 || @ Nationals || 4–2 || Liriano (10–4) || Strasburg (5–8) || Melancon (3) || 33,636 || 60–39
|-  style="background:#fbb;"
| 100 || July 25 || @ Nationals || 7–9 || Krol (1–0) || Morris (4–4) || —  || 38,862 || 60–40
|-  style="background:#fbb;"
| 101 || July 26 || @ Marlins || 0–2 || Álvarez (1–1) || Locke (9–3) || Cishek (21) || 18,718 || 60–41
|-  style="background:#cfc;"
| 102 || July 27 || @ Marlins || 7–4 ||Morton (3–2)  || Koehler (2–6) || Melancon (4) || 22,410 || 61–41
|-  style="background:#fbb;"
| 103 || July 28 || @ Marlins || 2–3 || Fernández (7–5) || Cole (5–4) || Cishek (22) || 24,207 || 61–42
|-  style="background:#cfc;"
| 104 || July 29 || Cardinals || 9–2 || Liriano (11–4) || Westbrook (7–5) || — || 32,084 || 62–42
|-  style="background:#cfc;"
| 105 || July 30 || Cardinals || 2–1 (11) || Mazzaro (6–2) || Siegrist (0–1) || — || N/A || 63–42
|-  style="background:#cfc;"
| 106 || July 30 || Cardinals || 6–0 || Cumpton (1–1) || Lyons (2–4) || — || 33,861 || 64–42
|-  style="background:#cfc;"
| 107 || July 31 || Cardinals || 5–4 || Watson (3–1) || Rosenthal (1–2) || Melancon (5) || 31,679 || 65–42
|-

|-  style="background:#fbb;"
| 108 || Aug 1 || Cardinals || 0–13 || Kelly (2–3) || Morton (3–3) || — || 31,999 || 65–43
|-  style="background:#fbb;"
| 109 || Aug 2 || Rockies || 2–4 || Chacín (10–5) || Cole (5–5) || Brothers (8) || 37,487 || 65–44
|-  style="background:#cfc;"
| 110 || Aug 3 || Rockies || 5–2 || Liriano (12–4) || de la Rosa (10–6) || Melancon (6) || 38,424 || 66–44
|-  style="background:#cfc;"
| 111 || Aug 4 || Rockies || 5–1 || Burnett (5–7) || Nicasio (6–6) || — || 37,980 || 67–44
|-  style="background:#cfc;"
| 112 || Aug 6 || Marlins || 4–3 || Morris (5–4) || Dunn (2–3) || — || 27,907 || 68–44
|-  style="background:#cfc;"
| 113 || Aug 7 || Marlins || 4–2 || Morton (4–3) || Koehler (3–7) || Melancon (7) || 28,173 || 69–44
|-  style="background:#cfc;"
| 114 || Aug 8 || Marlins || 5–4 (10) || Hughes (2–2) || Ames (0–1) || — || 33,646 || 70–44
|-  style="background:#fbb;"
| 115 || Aug 9 || @ Rockies || 1–10 || de la Rosa (11–6) || Liriano (12–5) || — || 37,444 || 70–45
|-  style="background:#fbb;"
| 116 || Aug 10 || @ Rockies || 4–6 || López (2–4) || Burnett (5–8) || Brothers (9) || 40,728 || 70–46
|-  style="background:#fbb;"
| 117 || Aug 11 || @ Rockies || 2–3 || Corpas (1–2) || Morris (5–5) || Brothers (10) || 44,657 || 70–47
|-  style="background:#fbb;"
| 118 || Aug 13 || @ Cardinals || 3–4 (14) || Freeman (1–0) || Hughes (2–3) || — || 40,243 || 70–48
|-  style="background:#cfc;"
| 119 || Aug 14 || @ Cardinals || 5–1 || Liriano (13–5) || Miller (11–8) || — || 40,644 || 71–48
|-  style="background:#fbb;"
| 120 || Aug 15 || @ Cardinals || 5–6 (12) || Siegrist (1–1) || Morris (5–6) || — || 41,502 || 71–49
|-  style="background:#cfc;"
| 121 || Aug 16 || Diamondbacks || 6–2 || Cole (6–5) || McCarthy (2–7) || — || 39,091 || 72–49
|-  style="background:#fbb;"
| 122 || Aug 17 || Diamondbacks || 5–15 || Cahill (4–10) || Locke (9–4) || — || 37,982 || 72–50
|-  style="background:#fbb;"
| 123 || Aug 18 || Diamondbacks || 2–4 (16) || Ziegler (7–1) || Johnson (0–1) || Putz (6) || 37,518 || 72–51
|-  style="background:#cfc;"
| 124 || Aug 19 || @ Padres || 3–1 || Liriano (14–5) || Cashner (8–8) || Melancon (8) || 24,850 || 73–51
|-  style="background:#cfc;"
| 125 || Aug 20 || @ Padres || 8–1 || Burnett (6–8) || Ross (3–6) || — || 21,381 || 74–51
|-  style="background:#fbb;"
| 126 || Aug 21 || @ Padres || 1–2 || Kennedy (5–9) || Cole (6–6) || Street (24) || 19,126 || 74–52
|-  style="background:#cfc;"
| 127 || Aug 22 || @ Giants || 10–5 || Gómez (3–0) || Moscoso (1–2) || — || 41,733 || 75–52
|-  style="background:#cfc;"
| 128 || Aug 23 || @ Giants || 3–1 || Morton (5–3) || Bumgarner (11–8) || Melancon (9) || 41,583 || 76–52
|-  style="background:#fbb;"
| 129 || Aug 24 || @ Giants || 3–6 || Lincecum (7–13) || Liriano (14–6) || Romo (31) || 42,059 || 76–53
|-  style="background:#fbb;"
| 130 || Aug 25 || @ Giants || 0–4 || Vogelsong (3–4) || Burnett (6–9) || — || 41,815 || 76–54
|-  style="background:#fbb;"
| 131 || Aug 27 || Brewers || 6–7 || Wooten (3–0) || Morris (5–7) || Henderson (22) || 23,801 || 76–55
|-  style="background:#cfc;"
| 132 || Aug 28 || Brewers || 7–1 || Morton (6–3) || Gorzelanny (3–6) || — || 20,634 || 77–55
|-  style="background:#fbb;"
| 133 || Aug 29 || Brewers || 0–4 || Gallardo (10–9) || Cole (6–7) || — || 23,747 || 77–56
|-  style="background:#cfc;"
| 134 || Aug 30 || Cardinals || 5–0 || Liriano (15–6) || Miller (12–9) || — || 38,026 || 78–56
|-  style="background:#cfc;"
| 135 || Aug 31 || Cardinals || 7–1 || Burnett (7–9) || Lynn (13–9) || — || 39,514 || 79–56
|-

|-  style="background:#fbb;"
| 136 || Sep 1 || Cardinals || 2–7 || Kelly (7–3) || Johnson (0–2) || — || 37,912 || 79–57
|-  style="background:#cfc;"
| 137 || Sep 2 || @ Brewers || 5–2 || Morton (7–3) || Thornburg (1–1) || Melancon (10) || 23,252 || 80–57
|-  style="background:#cfc;"
| 138 || Sep 3 || @ Brewers || 4–3 || Mazzaro (7–2) || Henderson (3–5) || Melancon (11) || 25,558 || 81–57
|-  style="background:#fbb;"
| 139 || Sep 4 || @ Brewers || 3–9 || Peralta (9–14) || Liriano (15–7) || — || 29,041 || 81–58
|-  style="background:#fbb;"
| 140 || Sep 6 || @ Cardinals || 8–12 || Kelly (8–3) || Burnett (7–10) || Mujica (36) || 40,608 || 81–59
|-  style="background:#fbb;"
| 141 || Sep 7 || @ Cardinals || 0–5 || Wainwright (16–9) || Locke (9–5) || — || 45,110 || 81–60
|-  style="background:#fbb;"
| 142 || Sep 8 || @ Cardinals || 2–9 || Wacha (3–0) || Morton (7–4) || — || 40,156 || 81–61
|-  style="background:#cfc;"
| 143 || Sep 9 || @ Rangers || 1–0 || Cole (7–7) || Darvish (12–8) || Melancon (12) || 33,243 || 82–61
|-  style="background:#cfc;"
| 144 || Sep 10 || @ Rangers || 5–4 || Liriano (16–7) || Perez (9–4) || Melancon (13) || 36,313 || 83–61
|-  style="background:#cfc;"
| 145 || Sep 11 || @ Rangers || 7–5 || Burnett (8–10) || Garza (3–4) || Farnsworth (1) || 30,629 || 84–61
|-  style="background:#cfc;"
| 146 || Sep 12 || Cubs || 3–1 || Locke (10–5) || Rusin (2–4) || Melancon (14) || 23,541 || 85–61
|-  style="background:#fbb;"
| 147 || Sep 13 || Cubs || 4–5 || Villanueva (6–8) || Grilli (0–2) || Gregg (32) || 35,962 || 85–62
|-  style="background:#cfc;"
| 148 || Sep 14 || Cubs || 2–1 || Cole (8–7) || Russell (1–6) || Melancon (15) || 37,534 || 86–62
|-  style="background:#cfc;"
| 149 || Sep 15 || Cubs || 3–2 || Farnsworth (3–0) || Strop (2–5) || Melancon (16) || 36,559 || 87–62
|-  style="background:#fbb;"
| 150 || Sep 16 || Padres || 0–2 || Cashner (10–8) || Burnett (8–11) || — || 20,633 || 87–63
|-  style="background:#fbb;"
| 151 || Sep 17 || Padres || 2–5 || Stults (9–13) || Locke (10–6) || Gregerson (4) || 22,520 || 87–64
|-  style="background:#fbb;"
| 152 || Sep 18 || Padres || 2–3 || Thayer (3–5) || Melancon (2–2) || Street (31) || 27,640 || 87–65
|-  style="background:#cfc;"
| 153 || Sep 19 || Padres || 10–1 || Cole (9–7) || Kennedy (6–10) || — || 26,242 || 88–65
|-  style="background:#fbb;"
| 154 || Sep 20 || Reds || 5–6 (10) || Hoover (5–5) || Farnsworth (3–1) || Chapman (38) || 37,940 || 88–66
|-  style="background:#cfc;"
| 155 || Sep 21 || Reds || 4–2 || Burnett (9–11) || Bailey (11–11) || Grilli (31) || 39,425 || 89–66
|-  style="background:#fbb;"
| 156 || Sep 22 || Reds || 3–11 || Arroyo (14–11) || Locke (10–7) || — || 38,699 || 89–67
|-  style="background:#cfc;"
| 157 || Sep 23 || @ Cubs || 2–1 || Melancon (3–2) || Gregg (2–6) || Grilli (32) || 32,289 || 90–67
|-  style="background:#cfc;"
| 158 || Sep 24 || @ Cubs || 8–2 || Cole (10–7) || Rusin (2–6)  || — || 34,138 || 91–67
|-  style="background:#fbb;"
| 159 || Sep 25 || @ Cubs || 2–4 || Arrieta (5–4) || Liriano (16–8) || Gregg (33) || 26,171 || 91–68
|-  style="background:#cfc;"
| 160 || Sep 27 || @ Reds || 4–1 || Burnett (10–11) || Bailey (11–12) || Grilli (33) || 40,107 || 92–68
|-  style="background:#cfc;"
| 161 || Sep 28 || @ Reds || 8–3 || Mazzaro (8–2) || Arroyo (14–12) || — || 40,707 || 93–68
|-  style="background:#cfc;"
| 162 || Sep 29 || @ Reds || 4–2 || Cumpton (2–1) || Reynolds (1–3) || Farnsworth (2) || 40,142 || 94–68
|-

|- style="text-align:center;"
| Legend:       = Win       = Loss       = PostponementBold = Pirates team member

Postseason

Wild Card Game

October 1 – National League Wild Card game – This game marked the first Pirates postseason appearance since 1992 and the first postseason game ever played at PNC Park. After a scoreless first inning and a half, the Pirates secured the first runs of the game with home runs by Marlon Byrd and Russell Martin in the bottom of the 2nd inning. In the bottom of the third, Pedro Alvarez hit a sacrifice-fly to Shin-Soo Choo, which allowed Andrew McCutchen to score. In the top of the fourth, with Choo and Ryan Ludwick on base, Jay Bruce hit a groundball single to Pirates left-fielder Starling Marte, allowing Choo to score.  In the bottom of the fourth, Marte and Neil Walker scored off RBI hits by Walker and Byrd, respectively.  In the bottom of the 7th inning, Russell Martin hit a solo home run.  The Reds could only further respond with a Choo home run off of Tony Watson.  The Pirates held on to win with Jason Grilli closing the game, setting the Pirates up to face the St. Louis Cardinals in the NLDS.

Division Series

October 3 – Game one – The Cardinals set a new NLDS record with seven runs in an inning, highlighted by Carlos Beltrán's three-run home run (443 feet), his 15th in post-season play tying Babe Ruth for eighth place on the list. Only Derek Jeter (20) and Albert Pujols (18) among active players had more at the time.
October 4 – Game two – The Pirates scored first with two outs in the second inning as Gerrit Cole drove in Pedro Álvarez with a single after Jordy Mercer was intentionally walked. Alvarez hit his second home run of the series in the third, a two-run line drive.  The Pirates added to their lead with two runs in the fifth inning as Marlon Byrd drove home Justin Morneau with a double and Russell Martin plated Byrd with a single.  The Cardinals finally got on the board with a solo home run from Yadier Molina in their half of the fifth inning. It was his third post-season home run. The Pirates added runs in the seventh inning as Martin plated Byrd again, this time via a sacrifice fly.
October 6 – Game three – The Pirates opened up their first non-Wild Card postseason home game in 21 years by scoring two runs in the first inning. The Cardinals would later tie the game in the fifth with a two-out RBI single by Carlos Beltrán. The Pirates responded by scoring the next inning on a Russell Martin sacrifice fly, which was later answered by a Carlos Beltrán home run in the eighth. The Pirates would retake the lead in the bottom of the 8th and win the game by the score of 5-3.
October 7 – Game four – Game 4 featured a quality start from St. Louis Cardinals rookie Michael Wacha. Wacha held the Pirates to just three base runners (one hit, two walks) through  innings pitched. It was the longest no-hitter length by a rookie pitcher since Jeff Tesreau went  innings with no hits allowed for the 1912 New York Giants.   Pedro Alvarez broke up Wacha's no-hitter in the eighth with his third home run of the series. Matt Holliday hit a two-run home run in the sixth, providing the Cardinals' margin of victory. Charlie Morton went  innings pitched, allowing just two runs.
October 9 – Game five – Game 5 pitted Game 1 winner Adam Wainwright against the Pirates' rookie Gerrit Cole.  The Cardinals got on the board first in the bottom of the second inning as Jon Jay walked with two-outs and David Freese broke the tie with a two-run home run.  The Cardinals added to their lead in the sixth as Jay singled home Matt Holliday to make it 3–0.  The Pirates rallied with two outs in the top of the seventh as Justin Morneau, Marlon Byrd and Pedro Alvarez all singled (the last driving home Morneau), but Wainwright was able to get Russell Martin to ground out to end the threat.  Entering the bottom of the eighth and with the Cardinals leading 3–1, they put the game out of reach as Matt Adams hit a two-run home run off of Mark Melancon to make it 5–1.  They added another run on a Pete Kozma single.  Wainwright finished the complete game by striking out Alvarez with two runners on base to end the Pirates' season.

Game log

|-  style="background:#cfc;"
| 1 || Oct 1 || Reds || 6–2 || Liriano (1–0) || Cueto (0–1) || — || 40,487 || 1–0
|-

|-  style="background:#fbb;"
| 1 || Oct 3 || @ Cardinals || 1–9 || Wainwright (1–0) || Burnett (0–1) || — || 45,693 || STL leads 1–0
|-  style="background:#cfc;"
| 2 || Oct 4 || @ Cardinals || 7–1 || Cole (1–0) || Lynn (0–1) || — || 45,999 || Tied 1–1
|-  style="background:#cfc;"
| 3 || Oct 6 || Cardinals || 5–3 || Melancon (1–0) || Martinez (0–1) || Grilli (1) || 40,489 || PIT leads 2–1
|-  style="background:#fbb;"
| 4 || Oct 7 || Cardinals || 1–2 || Wacha (1–0) || Morton (0–1) || Rosenthal (1) || 40,493 || Tied 2–2
|- style="background:#fbb;"
| 5 || Oct 9 || @ Cardinals || 1–6 ||  Wainwright (2–0) || Cole (1–1) || — || 47,231 || STL wins 3–2
|-

|- style="text-align:center;"
| Legend:       = Win       = Loss       = PostponementBold = Pirates team member

Roster

Opening Day lineup

Notable achievements

Awards
2013 Major League Baseball All-Star Game
Pedro Álvarez, 3B, reserve
Jason Grilli, P, reserve
Jeff Locke, P, reserve
Andrew McCutchen, OF, reserve
Mark Melancon, P, reserve – replaced Jeff Locke

NL Player of the Week
 Russell Martin (April 22–28)
 Pedro Álvarez (June 17–23)
 Francisco Liriano (July 29 – August 4)

MLB Delivery Man of the Month Award
 Jason Grilli (April)
 Jason Grilli (May)

NL Rookie of the Month
 Gerrit Cole (September)

The Sporting News Comeback Player of the Year Award
 Francisco Liriano

The Sporting News Manager of the Year Award
 Clint Hurdle

NL Comeback Player of the Year
 Francisco Liriano

NL Manager of the Year
 Clint Hurdle

NL MVP
 Andrew McCutchen

Milestones

Statistics
Batting
Note: G = Games played; AB = At bats; H = Hits; Avg. = Batting average; HR = Home runs; RBI = Runs batted in

 – Qualified for batting title (3.1 plate appearances per team game)

Pitching
Note: G = Games pitched; IP = Innings pitched; W = Wins; L = Losses; ERA = Earned run average; SO = Strikeouts

 – Qualified for ERA title (1 inning pitched per team game)

Legend
 Stats reflect time with the Pirates only.
† – Denotes player was acquired mid-season.
‡ – Denotes player was relinquished mid-season.

Transactions
The Pirates were involved in the following transactions during the 2013 season:
 Black line marks the transition between off season and regular season

Trades

Free agents

Waivers

Signings

Other

Draft picks

Farm system

References

External links

2013 Pittsburgh Pirates Schedule at MLB.com
2013 Pittsburgh Pirates season at Baseball Reference
Pittsburgh Pirates - 2013 at ESPN

Pittsburgh Pirates seasons
Pittsburgh Pirates season
Pitts